Tonhi Terenzi (born 16 March 1969) is an Italian fencer. He won a bronze medal in the team sabre event at the 1996 Summer Olympics.

References

External links
 

1969 births
Living people
Italian male fencers
Olympic fencers of Italy
Fencers at the 1992 Summer Olympics
Fencers at the 1996 Summer Olympics
Fencers at the 2000 Summer Olympics
Olympic bronze medalists for Italy
Olympic medalists in fencing
Sportspeople from Genoa
Medalists at the 1996 Summer Olympics
Universiade medalists in fencing
Universiade silver medalists for Italy
Fencers of Fiamme Oro
Medalists at the 1989 Summer Universiade